"It Should Be Easy" is a song recorded by American singer Britney Spears for her eighth studio album, Britney Jean (2013). It features the vocal collaboration of American rapper will.i.am. The song was written by Spears, will.i.am, David Guetta, Giorgio Tuinfort, Nicky Romero and Marcus van Wattum. According to EarOne, it was made available to Italian radio stations on June 13, 2014. It is the third collaboration between Spears and will.i.am, following "Big Fat Bass" from Spears' seventh studio album Femme Fatale (2011), and "Scream & Shout" from will.i.am's fourth studio album #willpower (2013).

Background and release
In May 2013, will.i.am was confirmed as the executive producer of Spears' eighth studio album Britney Jean, which was released in December 2013. He described that his recording process differed from his past experience with the Black Eyed Peas, elaborating that "[he and Spears] had these juicy sessions, where [they had] been bonding, building the trust and comfort."

Official remixes for "It Should Be Easy" were commissioned and serviced to clubs in January 2014. A spokesperson for Spears said that it would not see a release as a third single and that the remixes were "commissioned purely to be used in nightclubs". However, on June 13, 2014, the song was made available to Italian radio stations, according to EarOne.

Composition
"It Should Be Easy" is a EDM-inspired song that whose lyrics is about how love "shouldn't be complicated", with Spears imagining a bright-normal-future with a man who's stolen her heart. Spears' vocals has been called and considered "robotic" in the song.

Critical reception
Michael Cragg from The Guardian in his review of the album, called the song an "Auto-Tune blitzkrieg" that misplaces the proclamations about the album being personal or a reinvention of Spears.

Nicki Catucci from Entertainment Weekly compared the song with "Body Ache", another track on Britney Jean produced by Guetta, calling both songs "lousy" with anonymous female hook singers, "but these two songs transcend DJ filler because Britney never soft-pedals her voice’s uneasy layering of girly and libidinous. They're based more in tension than release".

Chart performance
"It Should Be Easy" charted at number 121 in France, number 88 in Canada and number 71 in Switzerland due to digital downloads. It also managed to peak at number 57 in Belgium. The song failed to chart on the Billboard Hot 100, but peaked at number 16 on the US Hot Dance/Electronic Songs and number 43 on the US Pop Digital Songs chart.

Credits and personnel
Credits adapted from AllMusic.

Britney Spears – lead vocals, songwriting
will.i.am – guest vocals, songwriting, instrumentation, production, vocal production
David Guetta – songwriting, engineer, instrumentation, production
Nicky Romero – songwriting, instrumentation, mixing, production
Giorgio Tuinfort – songwriting, engineer, instrumentation, production
Marcus van Wattum – songwriting, instrumentation, mixing, production
Anthony Preston – songwriting, instrumentation, production, vocal production

Charts

References

2013 songs
2014 singles
Britney Spears songs
Will.i.am songs
RCA Records singles
Song recordings produced by David Guetta
Song recordings produced by will.i.am
Songs written by Britney Spears
Songs written by David Guetta
Songs written by will.i.am
Songs written by Anthony Preston (record producer)
Electronic dance music songs